Richard Voss (2 September 1851 – 10 June 1918) was a German dramatist and novelist. In standard German orthography, his name is printed as Voß.

Biography
Voss was born at Neu-Grape near Pyritz, in Pomerania, the son of a country squire.

Though intended for the life of a country gentleman, he showed no inclination for outdoor life, and on his return from the war of 1870-71, in which he was wounded, he studied philosophy at Jena and Munich, and then settled at Berchtesgaden. In 1884 Charles Alexander, Grand Duke of Saxe-Weimar-Eisenach, appointed Voss as librarian of the Wartburg, but he later resigned the post, due to ill health.

Voss spent 25 years of his life living at Frascati, near Rome, where he wrote many of his novels and plays. He was granted honorary citizenship of the town.

Main works

Plays
Savonarola (1878)
Magda (1879)
Die Patricierin, a classical drama, which won the Schiller prize in 1896 (The Patrician Dame; 1880)
Pater Modestus, dealing with the problem of religion (1882)
Der Mohr des Zaren (1883)
Unehrlich Volk (1885)
Alexandra (1888)
Eva (1889)
Wehe dem Besiegten (Woe to the Vanquished; 1889)
Die neue Zeit (1891)
Schuldig (1892)
Lebenskünstler (1902)

Novels
San Sebastian (1883)
Der Sohn der Volskerin (1885)
Die Sabinerin, remarkable for its beautiful descriptions of Italian country (1888)
Der Mönch von Berchtesgaden (1891)
Villa Falconieri, the story of a successful poet who lost confidence in his powers (1896)
Der neue Gott (1898)
Die Rächerin (1899)
Amata, a story of Rome in Nero's time (1901)
Römisches Fieber (1902)
Allerlei Erlebtes (1902)
Die Leute von Valdars (1902)
Die Schuldige, novel in two parts (1907)
Alpentragödie (1909)
Zwei Menschen (1911)

Filmography
Perjury, directed by Harry F. Millarde (1921)
Die Schuldige, directed by Fred Sauer (1921)
Two People, directed by Hanns Schwarz (1924)
Ein Lebenskünstler, directed by Holger-Madsen (1925)
Alpine Tragedy, directed by Robert Land (1927)
Guilty, directed by Johannes Meyer (1928)
Villa Falconieri, directed by Richard Oswald (1928)
Two People, directed by Erich Waschneck (1930)
Two People, directed by Paul May (1952)

Notes

References

Attribution

External links
 
 

1851 births
1918 deaths
People from Pyrzyce County
People from the Province of Pomerania
19th-century German novelists
20th-century German novelists
German male novelists
German male dramatists and playwrights
19th-century German dramatists and playwrights
19th-century German male writers
20th-century German male writers